The Philippines  competed at the inaugural World Beach Games in Doha, Qatar from 10 to 12 October 2019. The country was represented by two athletes in two sports; aquathlete Claire Adorna and skateboarder Jericho Francisco. They were accompanied by four officials with Tom Carrasco as the delegation's chef de mission.

Competitors

Aquathlon

Skateboarding

References

Nations at the 2019 World Beach Games
World Beach Games